Ivan Karlović (c. 1485 – 9 August 1531), also known as by his Latin name Johannes Torquatus, was the Count of Krbava, and Ban of Croatia from 1521 to 1524 and again from 1527 to 1531. In defense against Ottoman Empire expansion, he lost most of his personal holdings. He was the last male descendant of the Kurjaković family from the noble tribe of Gusić, and after his death the estates went to Nikola III Zrinski who married his sister Jelena Kurjaković. Karlović is positively remembered in the Croatian folk poetry.

Early life 
Ivan was born c. 1485 in Udbina, as the son of Karlo Kurjaković, and Dorothea Frankopan. After his father's death in 1493, he inherited vast estates of the family, including županijas Krbava, Odorje, Hotuča, Lapac, part of Lika and several fortified cities in near županijas, as well the title of the Count of Krbava. During his lifetime, in a similar fashion to other Croatian and European noblemen, had an anachronistic tendency to trace his family ancestry to Roman patricians, in his case to Titus Manlius Imperiosus Torquatus, a thesis which was also wrongly argued by Miklós Istvánffy and Pavao Ritter Vitezović, and hence he and his sister Klara named themselves as "Torkvat".

History 
At the time his estates were on the first front of the Ottoman Empire conquest. In the fighting he tried to rely on the help of Hungarian-Croatian King, the House of Habsburg, Republic of Venice or even agreements of paying tribute with the Ottomans in 1506 and 1511. In 1500, defeated Ottoman army near Gradac (today Gračac). In the Hungarian succession crisis, he supported Maximilian I, Holy Roman Emperor against Hungarian-Croatian King Vladislaus II of Hungary in 1506. Between 1505 and 1509 he owned town Mutnik and market town Belaj (today village Bilaj near Gospić). In 1508, temporary fought against Maximilian I's army in the hinterland of Venice, when on return successfully defended Mutnik from Croatian noblemen, and was possibly helped by the Ottoman forces. Between 1509 and 1524, made several Condottieri contracts with Venice to defend the Republic's estates in Dalmatia. In 1510, refused to be one the military commanders in a campaign to free Dalmatia from Venetian authority, but due to lack of finances the war did not happen.

In 1513, as Vice-Ban and Captain of Croatia and Dalmatia (1512–1513), with Petar Berislavić, then Ban of Croatia, and other noblemen defeated the Ottomans at the Battle of Dubica. However, in 1514 the Ottomans raided his estates in Krbava and Lika, as well fought against in Bosnia. In 1517, as the situation was becoming more desperate, tried to replace his estates with forts in Lombardia under Venetian authority, and once again in the mid-1520s, but it was rejected with only a promise of financial help. In 1519, Stjepan Posedarski, a humanist, chaplain and envoy of Karlović from the Posedarski branch of the Gusić tribe, in the name of Karlović delivered anti-Ottoman speech Oratio Stephani Possedarski habita apud Leonem decimum pontificem maximum pro domino Ioanne Torquato comite Corbauie defensore Crouacie to Pope Leo X. In it, Karlović was represented as a true defender of his and other lands, in the name of faith, freedom, and survival, who is losing faith defending the Holy Church and asking for help. The speech was noted in the West but had little success.

In 1521, in the name of a group of Croatian nobility unsuccessfully negotiated with the Ottomans. In the same year was named as Ban of Croatia, Slavonia, and Dalmatia, and trying to organize a defense against the Ottomans decided to only engage in field battles as could not get support for the defense of royal towns, and as such could not prevent Siege of Knin, fall of Skradin and Ostrovica Fortress. He regularly received military and financial help from Archduke Ferdinand I, but most importantly did not by Hungarian-Croatian King Louis II. As he steadily impoverished fighting and noblemen did not accept to increase revenue with new taxes in 1523, he renounced from the position of Ban in 1524.

In December 1526, he attended Croatian Election in Cetin along with several other most important Croatian noble magnates, where on 1 January 1527 signed a charter with which was elected Ferdinand I from the House of Habsburg as the King of Croatia, regarding them as the only house which could help against the Ottoman invasion. The election was part of a succession crisis and civil war as lower nobility in Hungary and Slavonia supported John Zápolya, but Karlović mostly stayed neutral during the war, and after the death of Christoph Frankopan, contributed to reconciliation between conflicting sides in 1530.

In 1527, along Ferenc Batthyány, was again named as Ban of Croatia, Slavonia, and Dalmatia, on which position remained until his death in 1531. As the Ottomans conquered his forts Obrovac, Udbina, Komić, and Mrsinj-grad, from Ferdinand I received estates of Medvedgrad, Lukavec and Rakovec in Turopolje. In 1528, near Belaj commanded a Croatian army with some Carniolan forces which defeated several thousand Ottomans who were preparing to raid into Carniola. In the next year led the Croatian forces to help at Siege of Vienna (1529).

Death 
Ivan Karlović died on 9 August 1531, in Medvedgrad. He was buried in the Church of the Assumption of the Blessed Virgin Mary in Remete, Zagreb, Croatia. As he did not have any descendants in marriage with the niece of cardinal Tamás Bakócz, according to the inheritance contract with Nikola III Zrinski from 1509, who married his sister Jelena Kurjaković, the estates were inherited by Zrinski family. At the time, Karlović had 22 forts and cities in three županijas and two župas, of which most prominent were Udbina, Krbava, Kurjak-grad, Turan, Počitelj, Podlapčec (Podlapac), Mrsinj-grad, Lovinac, Gradac (Gračac), Novigrad, Zvonigrad, Zelengrad, Kličevac (Kličevica), Bag, Obrovac and Stari Obrovac.

His sister Jelena was the mother of the future Ban of Croatia and hero of the Siege of Szigetvár (1566), Nikola IV Zrinski. Karlović nephews Nikola and Ivan Zrinski in 1541 took care to carve the inscription on the tombstone, saying "Sepultus genere Spectabilis militiaque praeditus magnificus dominus Torquatus, comes Corbaviae regnorumque Croatiae et Sclavoniae banus mole sub hac tegitur", however the inscription with the coat of arms got lost over the centuries. In a 16th century Glagolithic document his seal and coats of arms were described to have a goose on a shield, above them letters I. C., meaning Joannes Caroli. In 1736, Hungarian polymath Samuel Timon described the alleged coat of arms on the tombstone, and according to it in 1802 Károly Wagner described the color, but they were inspired by 17th-century armorials like Opus Insignium Armorumque (1687–1688) by Johann Weikhard von Valvasor.

Legacy 
In the folk tradition, the fortified towns in ruin like Komić, Kozja Draga, and Mazin are still called as Karlovića dvori ("Karlović's palaces"). Karlović is the main character of the novel Ivan Hrvaćanin (1926) by Fran Binički.

Folk poetry 
Karlović is also remembered in the folk poetry including bugarštica (for example Kad se Ivan Karlović vjerio za kćer kralja Budimskoga), and of the Molise Croats in Southern Italy, Burgenland Croats in Austria, and Bosniaks, probably the descendants of his former subjects. He is mentioned as Ivan or Jivan Karlović, Ive Karlovićev, Ivan Dovice, did Karlović, Karlo Vića, and Ivan Hrvaćanin. In Molise are preserved several fragmented variations of an old song in Shtokavian-Chakavian with Ikavian accent, while longer variation can be found in Chakavian with Ekavian-Ikavian accent.

He is generally featured as a noble and good master, tireless warrior against the Ottomans. On the other hand, in Molise has a negative connotation, depicted as being feared by girls picking flowers in a meadow. The story about girls being feared of intercourse with heroes is a common folk theme where heroes identity is less significant as the songs were preserved and performed in wedding customs. There his true identity was forgotten and possibly was related to the fear and danger during the Ottomans conquest, but his mention is indicative for the date of migration and ethnic identity of the community in Molise.

See also 
Croatian nobility
List of noble families of Croatia
Twelve noble tribes of Croatia

References

Notes

Sources 

 

 

Other bibliography

Petar Grgec, Hrvatski Job šesnaestoga vijeka ban Ivan Karlović, 1932, Hrv. knjiž. društvo sv. Jeronima, Zagreb

Bans of Croatia
Croatian nobility
Military commanders of Croatian kingdoms
16th-century Croatian people
1531 deaths
1485 births
History of Lika
1520s in Croatia
15th-century Croatian nobility
16th-century Croatian nobility